Royal Ballads is an album by saxophonist Clifford Jordan's Quartet which was recorded in late 1986 and released on the Dutch Criss Cross Jazz label.

Reception

In his review on Allmusic, Ken Dryden stated "Clifford Jordan was still an important tenor saxophonist during the years prior to his death in 1993, though his final recording for Criss Cross is one of his lesser known dates... Any fan of Clifford Jordan will want to seek out this release"

Track listing 
 "Lush Life" (Billy Strayhorn) - 7:53
 "Pannonica" (Thelonious Monk) - 6:55
 "Royal Blues" (Clifford Jordan) - 8:19
 "Little Girl Blue" (Lorenz Hart, Richard Rodgers) - 8:18
 "Armando"  (Vernel Fournier) - 8:06
 "Don't Get Around Much Anymore" (Duke Ellington, Bob Russell) - 6:56
 "Everything Happens to Me" (Tom Adair, Matt Dennis) - 3:51 Bonus track on CD
 "'Round About Midnight" (Thelonious Monk) - 8:24 Bonus track on CD

Personnel 
Clifford Jordan - tenor saxophone 
Kevin O'Connell - piano
Ed Howard - bass
Vernel Fournier - drums

References 

Clifford Jordan albums
1987 albums
Criss Cross Jazz albums
Albums recorded at Van Gelder Studio